Potassium channel subfamily K member 5 is a protein that in humans is encoded by the KCNK5 gene.

This gene encodes K2P5.1, one of the members of the superfamily of potassium channel proteins containing two pore-forming P domains. The message for this gene is mainly expressed in the cortical distal tubules and collecting ducts of the kidney. The protein is highly sensitive to external pH and this, in combination with its expression pattern, suggests it may play an important role in renal potassium transport.

See also
 Tandem pore domain potassium channel

References

Further reading

External links 
 

Ion channels